is a train station in Fukuyama, Hiroshima Prefecture, Japan.

Lines 
West Japan Railway Company
Fukuen Line

Station layout 
This is an above-ground station (stop) with a single platform and one line on the right side toward Fuchu. Because it is a pole station, both Fukuyama-bound and Fuchu-bound trains share the same platform. The station building, a wooden structure built before World War II, was in use until February 2, 2021. The men's and women's flush toilet was in use until September 2020, when it was demolished to make way for the station building reconstruction. The site is now used as a bicycle parking lot.

A new concrete station building was put into service on February 3, 2021.

The station is currently unmanned and managed by Fukuyama Station, but until February 29, 2020, JR West Okayama Mentech was entrusted with station operations.

Adjacent stations

|-
!colspan=5|JR West

Railway stations in Hiroshima Prefecture
Railway stations in Japan opened in 1914